The Sportpaleis Alkmaar is a velodrome and multisport indoor arena in Alkmaar, the Netherlands. The original velodrome, which was built in 1964 and made of concrete, was renovated in 2003. The concrete track was replaced by a wooden track and was now situated in a completely covered hall. The maximum slope is 42°. The track encloses a multifunctional indoor sportsfield. The hall has a capacity for 4750 spectators.

External links

Sports venues in Alkmaar
Cycling in Alkmaar
Cycle racing in the Netherlands
Indoor arenas in the Netherlands
Velodromes in the Netherlands